Rue Oberkampf (Oberkampf Street) is a street in the 11th arrondissement of Paris. It is named for Christophe-Philippe Oberkampf, an 18th-century Bavaria-born French industrialist.

References

Oberkampf